Bradley West Solicitors Nominee Co Ltd v Keeman (1994) 2 NZLR 111 is a cited case in New Zealand regarding the common law remedy of rectification.

References

Court of Appeal of New Zealand cases
New Zealand contract case law
1994 in case law
1994 in New Zealand law